Events from the year 1550 in France

Incumbents
 Monarch – Henry II

Events

 March 24 – "Rough Wooing": England and France sign the Treaty of Boulogne, by which England withdraws from Boulogne in France and returns territorial gains in Scotland.
 The first grammatical description of the French language is published by Louis Maigret.

Births
 
27 July – Charles IX of France (died 1574)

Full date missing
Jean Beguin, iatrochemist (died 1620)
Marin le Bourgeoys, artist and inventor (died 1634)

Deaths

Full date missing
Philippe de la Chambre, cardinal (born c.1480)
Jean, Cardinal of Lorraine (born 1498)
Eguinaire Baron, jurist (born 1495)
Georges II d'Amboise, bishop and cardinal (born 1488)

See also

References

1550s in France